The unstreaked tit-tyrant (Uromyias agraphia) is a species of bird in the family Tyrannidae. 
It is endemic to Peru.

Its natural habitat is subtropical or tropical moist montane forests.

References

Cited texts
 

unstreaked tit-tyrant
Birds of the Peruvian Andes
unstreaked tit-tyrant
Taxonomy articles created by Polbot